Hoyle's Official Book of Games (or Hoyle Series or Hoyle Games) is a series of games developed and published by Sierra On-Line.  Volume 1, released in 1989, featured multi-player card games.  Volume 2, released in 1990, featured 28 varieties of Solitaire.  Volume 3, released in 1991, featured board games. Volume 4, was a remake of Volume 1, with two additional games. Sierra continued to publish more games to the series up to its demise. Encore Software has continued publishing entries to the series since then. According to Hoyle 1, it was essentially a spiritual sequel to Sierra's Hi-Res Cribbage (1981).

Volume 1 

Hoyle's Official Book of Games: Volume 1 was the first card game simulator series released by Sierra entertainment. The series owes its name to Edmond Hoyle.

The Hoyle trademark and facecards were used under license from Brown & Bigelow Inc.

Games
The games included are: Crazy Eights, Old Maid, Hearts, Gin Rummy, Cribbage, and Klondike.

Characters 
For all games, except the last, the player could choose opponents, each having their own AI and manner of playing. These opponents included historical figures, members of Sierra staff, and characters from Sierra games.

When the player took too long making a decision, the characters started having dialogues, each according to his background. For example, Leisure Suit Larry begins to comment about women, while Roger Wilco wants to escape the game to save the universe again.

Sonny Bonds
Bulldog
Cassie
Christina
Devin
Diane
Colonel Henri Dijon
King Graham
The Kid
Larry Laffer
Shelly LeBlanc
Lenny
Jerry Moore
Princess Rosella
Warren Schwader
Sol Silverman
Thelma
Roger Wilco

Development
The original concept was submitted to Ken Williams (CEO/Founder of Sierra On-Line) by Warren Schwader. Once the project was greenlit, Warren acted as the Lead Programmer as well as the Game Designer. The games were programmed using Sierra On-line's proprietary scripting language: Sierra Creative Interpreter (SCI). SCI was originally created to aid in the development of Sierra's core line of adventure games. Working with SCI to implement card games and to code artificial intelligence for the characters proved challenging.

Warren Schwader continued as the Lead Programmer and Game Designer for the next two games in the series. Rob Atesalp was the composer and sound designer for the original and next two games.

Reception
The game sold over 250,000 copies by 1990.

Volume 2

Hoyle's Official Book of Games: Volume 2 is the next volume in the Hoyle card games simulator series by Sierra Entertainment.  This time, the pack offered 28 games, as opposed to the first volume's six. The other main difference between the two was that all the games were solitaire variants, so there was no option for choosing opponents.  Subsequently, the game did not feature any Sierra characters for co-players.

The 28 solitaire games offered are: Calculation, Strategy, Eagle Wing, Beleaguered Castle, Klondike, Canfield, Golf, Flower Garden, Scorpion, Spiderette, La Belle Lucie, Fortress, Baker's Dozen, Bristol, Eight Off, Shamrocks, Yukon, Eliminator, Slide, Bowling, Nestor, Aces Up, Gaps, Penguin, Pyramid, Triplets, and Poker Square.

Volume 3

Hoyle's Official Book of Games: Volume 3 was the third volume in Sierra On-Line's series of computer games based on the officially licensed Hoyle rules and trademark. Unlike the two previous games, this one was made with Sierra's new improved VGA engine, and focused on board games, where the previous entries in the series had featured card games.

Games featured were Backgammon, Checkers, Dominoes, Yacht (the original ancestor of the trademarked game Yahtzee), Pachisi, and Snakes and Ladders.

Characters
Like the first volume, and unlike the second volume, this game offers Sierra characters as opponents in the various games.

They do not interact with each other or have conversations as in the first game, but several of them have themed comments, catch phrase or accented style comments (though these are uncommon). For example, the Sheriff may refer to himself as the "Great Nottingham", or Baba Yaga who refers to her opponents as 'dearie'. Some characters are more specific than others, and some are more generic. It also depends on the game, a character might have more interesting things to say about plays in one game, but have generic comments to say in another.

Good guys
 Mother Goose (Mixed-Up Mother Goose)
 King Graham (King's Quest series)
 Rosella (King's Quest series)
 Larry Laffer (Leisure Suit Larry series)
 Passionate Patti (Leisure Suit Larry series)
 Jones (Jones in the Fast Lane)
 Sonny Bonds (Police Quest series)
 Roger Wilco (Space Quest series)
 Laura Bow (The Colonel's Bequest and The Dagger of Amon Ra)

Evil guys
 Ad Avis (Quest for Glory II)
 Baba Yaga (Quest for Glory I)
 Lillian (The Colonel's Bequest)
 Arnoid (Space Quest III)
 Mordack (King's Quest V)
 Mr. Big (Leisure Suit Larry V)
 Lolotte (King's Quest IV)
 Vohaul (Space Quest II)
 Sheriff of Nottingham (Conquests of the Longbow)

Hoyle Classic Card Games (Hoyle 4)
Hoyle Classic Card Games (Hoyle 4) was a remake of Volume I, released with VGA support, speech and original soundtrack. There was a set with 'Classic Characters' to play with and one with an increased number of Sierra characters as well. Load screens involve a silly comments made by the Classic characters, in relationship to whatever game was loading. The number of games was increased to eight, with the inclusion of Contract Bridge and Euchre.

There is some digitized speech for each character. Each character has five unique expressions in full speech (ranging from dislike at the plays, happiness, or praise). There are a few additional text based messages in theme for each character for some of the games, but only relate to the gameplay (characters do not have conversations with each other outside of the scope of the game). All the artwork and character sprites look like old fashioned and sepia-toned.

Classic characters:
 Dinky
 Scout
 Crazy Jack
 Trudy
 Josephine
 Billy Joe
 Chip
 Winthorp
 Fairbanks

Sierra characters: 
 King Graham
 Pepper
 Willy Beamish
 Larry Laffer
 Quarky
 Laura Bow
 Adam
 Roger Wilco
 Dr. Brain.

Hoyle Classic Games (Hoyle 5)
The first CD-ROM version of the game (1995), has over 30 characters to choose from including 'animated', 'icon', and 'business'.

Characters
Animated
 Jeb
 Leopold
 Natasha
 Stella
 Luke
 Sam
 Capt. Barnes
 Beatrice
 Dorothie
 Toby
 Finnian

Business
 Noel
 Lance
 Beverly
 Rose
 Sharon
 Roger
 Jim
 Heidi
 Kate
 Maxwell
 Phillip

Other games in the series
By the late 1990s, the new versions of each game were published almost yearly.
 Hoyle Classic
 Hoyle Classic Games (1995)
 Hoyle Classic Games 2 (1999)
 Hoyle Classic Solitaire (1996, 1998)
 Hoyle Classic Board Games (1997)
 Hoyle Board Games (1998, 1999, 2000, 2001, 2002)
 Hoyle Classic Board Games Collection (2012)
 Hoyle Card Games (1997, 1999, 2000, 2001, 2002, 2003, 2004, 2005)
 Hoyle Card Games (2010)
 Hoyle Card Games (2012)
 Hoyle Bridge (1997)
 Hoyle Backgammon
 Hoyle Backgammon & Cribbage
 Hoyle Blackjack (1996)
 Hoyle Craps & Blackjack (1999)
 Hoyle Hearts & Spades (1998, 1999)
 Hoyle Poker (1997) (a.k.a. Hoyle Classic Poker and Hoyle Friday Night Poker)
 Hoyle Crosswords (1999)
 Hoyle Enchanted Puzzles
 Hoyle Kids Games (2000, 2001)
 Hoyle Children's Collection (1996)
 Hoyle Children's Collection (2007)
 Hoyle Slots & Video Poker (with Horse Racing) (1999)
 Hoyle Slots (2001)
 Hoyle Solitaire and Mahjong Tiles (1999, 2000)
 Hoyle Puzzle Games (2002, 2003)
 Hoyle Puzzle & Board Games (2004)
 Hoyle Puzzle & Board Games (2008)
 Hoyle Puzzle & Board Games (2009)
 Hoyle Casino series (1996–2016)
 Hoyle Casino Empire (2002)
 Hoyle Table Games (2003)
 Hoyle Word Games (1999, 2000, 2001)
 Hoyle Majestic Chess (2003)
 Hoyle Bridge & Euchre (1998, 1999)
 Hoyle Texas Hold'Em (2006)
 Hoyle Battling Ships & War (1998)
 Hoyle Mahjong Tiles (2000)
 Hoyle Puzzle Board Games (2012)
 Hoyle Classic Board Game Collection 2 (2012)
 Hoyle Card, Puzzle & Board Games (2013)
 Hoyle Card Games (Game Boy Color)

Collections
 Xplosiv (2001)
Board, Card, Casino
 Hoyle Collection (2003)
Card, Casino
 Hoyle Games 2003 (2003)
 Hoyle Classic Games Pack: Fun for the Whole Family (2003)
Includes Hoyle Classic Games 2, Hoyle Slots/Video Poker, and Hoyle. SOlitaire/Majong, and Hoyle Friday Night Poker. 
 Hoyle Game Collection (2001)
Includes Hoyle Board Games, Hoyle Card Games, Hoyle Texas Hold'Em, and Hoyle Slots, and Video Poker.

Reception
Computer Gaming World stated that interacting with Sierra characters in Volume 1 such as Leisure Suit Larry and Princess Rosella was fun, but annoying for those who preferred cards to humor. It criticized Volume 1 for slow performance and cribbage's deviation from the official Hoyle's rules, and stated that the other games were "really children's games and offer no great excitement".

References

1989 video games
1990 video games
1991 video games
Activision Blizzard franchises
Amiga games
Atari ST games
Digital card games
Classic Mac OS games
DOS games
Multiple-game video board games
North America-exclusive video games
Patience video games
ScummVM-supported games
Sierra Entertainment games
Tile-based video games
Video game franchises
Video game franchises introduced in 1989
Video games developed in the United States